The 2013 Global RallyCross Championship was the third season of this championship. The season consisted of nine weekends, three in X Games events (including a doubleheader after an event cancellation). Toomas Heikkinen earned his first series championship after a record-setting streak of five consecutive victories.

Rules changes

A penalty box will be added for this season. In case of a false start, the driver must endure a stop-go penalty in this zone avoiding the need to restart the race. Stop-go penalty can be also given for too aggressive car-to-car contact, such causing a competing driver to spin out by pushing their car.

Teams and drivers

Schedule

''(DH): An event in Barcelona at Lluís Companys Olympic Stadium May 19 was called off because of weather conditions. The Munich round, originally scheduled for June 30, was converted into a doubleheader round with races on June 29 and 30.

Season summary
The first event of the season in Foz do Iguaçu was performed on a purpose built gravel track, with the start/finish straight having the only tarmac section. Fifteen drivers took part in the event. Liam Doran set the fastest laptime in the seeding round. Heat 1 was won by Finnish driver Toomas Heikkinen, who took advantage of a crash at the start of the heat. Ken Block took second place, with Liam Doran placed third, after retiring on Lap 1. Heat 2 was won by Brian Deegan followed by Travis Pastrana is second. Nelson Piquet Jr. finished third despite being penalized for a jump start. Bryce Menzies finished the heat in last place. In Heat 3 the reigning champion Tanner Foust took victory over Steve Arpin. Patrik Sandell and Mauricio Neves finished in third and fourth place, respectively. Scott Speed was the winner of Heat 4 by passing Anton Marklund on the last corner, despite spinning on the first lap. Buddy Rice ended up third, with Eduardo Marques, Jr rounding off the heat. Buddy Rice won the Last Chance Qualifier, meaning he qualified for the final along with second-place finisher Patrik Sandell. Doran's car failure at the start of the race, retires both himself and Bryce Menzies, denying them both of qualifying for the final.

The Final saw mayhem at the first turn on Lap 1, which shook up the field, placing Heikkinen into the lead from Speed and Marklund after Lap 1. After Lap 2, Speed slowed down, which allowed Marklund to jump into second place. By the end of Lap 3, the race is red flagged, and is scheduled to restart, after retirements from Foust, Pastrana, Block and Rice. On the restart, Scott Speed sat on pole from a six car grid. Travis Pastrana, Buddy Rice, Ken Block and reigning champion Tanner Foust were all unable to make the restart. On Lap 1 Toomas Heikkinen aggressively made his way into the lead, ahead of Speed and Arpin by the end of the lap. On the second lap, Arpin took the joker lap, but failed to pass Speed, leaving the top three the same after the end of the lap. On Lap 4, Sandell takes the joker lap to pass Arpin into 3rd place, as Speed starts closing down Heikkinen for the lead. On the final lap, Speed finally used his joker lap to pass Heikkinen on the last corner of the race, to take the gold medal. Heikkinen won the silver, and Sandell the bronze. For all three of them it was their first X Games medals, most notably Speed, who had not ever drove a rally car prior to the event. Steve Arpin finished 4th, ahead of Brian Deegan in 5th, and Anton Marklund in 6th.

The second round of the season was set to take place in Lluís Companys Olympic Stadium, as part of the Barcelona X Games. Spanish drivers Nani Roma and Carlos Sainz, both Dakar Rally champions, arrived to debut in this event. However, after heavy rain all day, the whole event was eventually moved to Munich after several delays on May 19, and the Munich event turned into a doubleheader. Day 1 featured Liam Doran win in his new Mini, while Toomas Heikkinen won gold in race 2. The Subaru PUMA Rallycross Team USA made their 2013 debut, and Townsend Bell made his GRC debut in the #7 Royal Purple Ford Fiesta, for OMSE2.

Round 4 took place in Loudon, New Hampshire, at the New Hampshire Motor Speedway. GRC Lites made their debut there, and Joni Wiman won the first-ever Lites race. In the Supercar class, Travis Pastrana returned, and Tanner Foust led 9 of 10 laps in the final, but crashed in the final corner, handing the win to Heikkinen. The fifth round of the season took place in Bristol. Joni Wiman won the Lites final, which had to be restarted because Kevin Eriksson flipped over on the first lap. Patrik Sandell won his heat, but Heikkinen cruised to an easy third victory in a row. Round 6 took place at Irwindale Speedway, as part of X Games Los Angeles. David Sterckx, Rhys Millen, and Stephan Verdier made their 2013 debut, and Reinis Nitišs made his Lites debut. In Supercars, Sverre Isachsen won heat 1, which had to be restarted because Steve Arpin crashed. Heat 2 saw Liam Doran win. Toomas Heikkinen won Heat 3, while Heat 4 went to Ken Block. Anton Marklund crashed on the 1st turn of the LCQ, and that caused the 2nd red flag of the day. Marklund was out. On the restart, Rhys Millen and Scott Speed advanced. In the final, Ken Block, Liam Doran, and others crashed on the first turn. Toomas Heikkinen won the final X Games LA gold medal in history. Tanner Foust took silver, and Sverre Isachsen took bronze.

Round 7 took place at Atlanta Motor Speedway, as a standalone event. Bryce Menzies was replaced by Henning Solberg in the #99 Dodge, and Travis Pastrana was once again replaced by Timur Timerzyanov. Patrik Sandell crashed into a dirt embankment in the LCQ, sending him airborne. Toomas Heikkinen almost secured the championship with another win, while Joni Wiman won in Lites. Round 8 took place at the dirt track at Charlotte Motor Speedway, where Pat Moro debuted his new Chevrolet Sonic and Dave Mirra helped Prodrive make its official debut, after having rented its Mini to Doran for much of the season. Block, Speed and Deegan took heat victories, while Foust missed the final after rolling his car during the final heat. Speed won the final, while third place for Heikkinen (having qualified via the LCQ) gave him the championship title.

The season finale took place in Las Vegas during the week of the SEMA Show as a two-day event, with practice, seeding, and the first set of heats run on Wednesday and the second set of heats, LCQ, and final run on Thursday. Heikkinen aimed to continue his streak of eight consecutive podiums with a pair of heat wins, while Foust, Block, and Speed also swept each of their heats. The LCQ saw Nelson Piquet Jr. spin Sverre Isachsen to earn a transfer spot and land his Mitsubishi in the final, but a protest from Isachsen saw stewards disqualify Piquet for aggressive driving and restore the transfer spot to the Norwegian. In the final, a jump start from Foust forced him into the penalty box, giving Block a lead that he would never relinquish. Block would earn his first GRC victory in his 17th GRC start, while Foust ended the season with a runner-up finish and Travis Pastrana completed the podium.

Results

Events

Drivers standings

Points are awarded to the top sixteen finishers using the following structure:

 Bold indicates the fastest in the seeding round.
 * indicates a heat win.

GRC Lites

{|
|valign="top"|

References

X Games
Global RallyCross
GRC Rallycross